The cinereous conebill (Conirostrum cinereum) is a species of bird in the tanager family Thraupidae.  The term cinereous describes its colouration.  It is found in Bolivia, Chile, Colombia, Ecuador, and Peru.  Its natural habitats are subtropical or tropical moist shrubland, subtropical or tropical high-altitude shrubland, and heavily degraded former forest.

Gallery

References

cinereous conebill
Birds of Peru
Birds of the Bolivian Andes
Western South American coastal birds
cinereous conebill
Taxonomy articles created by Polbot